David Tshama (born 12 December 1996) is a Congolese professional boxer who has held the African middleweight title since 2020. As an amateur, he competed in the men's middleweight event at the 2020 Summer Olympics.

Professional boxing record

References

External links
 

1996 births
Living people
Democratic Republic of the Congo male boxers
Olympic boxers of the Democratic Republic of the Congo
Boxers at the 2020 Summer Olympics
Place of birth missing (living people)
21st-century Democratic Republic of the Congo people
Middleweight boxers
African Boxing Union champions